Eloise Blackwell (born 28 December 1990) is a New Zealand rugby union player. She made her debut for the Black Ferns in 2011 against England. She was selected for the 2017 Women's Rugby World Cup squad.

Biography 
Blackwell was a member of the Black Ferns squad that lost to Ireland in the 2014 World Cup. In 2019 she was part of the winning team of the Women's Super Rugby Series.

Blackwell is a teacher by profession and teaches at Epsom Girls' Grammar School. She graduated with a Bachelor's degree in Physical education from the University of Auckland in 2013.

Blackwell played for the Blues against the Chiefs in the first-ever women's Super Rugby match in New Zealand on 1 May 2021. On 3 November 2021, She was named in the Blues squad for the inaugural Super Rugby Aupiki competition. She featured in their 0–35 thrashing by the Chiefs Manawa in the final round.

References

External links 
 Eloise Blackwell at Black Ferns

1990 births
Living people
New Zealand female rugby union players
New Zealand women's international rugby union players